J.T. Taylor is an American mixed martial artist born in Oregon. Known as The General, he has fought notable fighters such as Shonie Carter, Rhonald Jhun, Chris Lytle, and Ryan Schultz. He fought a total of four times for the World Extreme Cagefighting organization. He recently wrestled to a draw in a Budofights event. Lyle Beerbohm called Taylor out, but the fight has yet to materialise.

Mixed martial arts record

|-
| Loss
| align=center| 7-7 (1)
| Eddy Ellis
| KO (Punch to the Body)
| UCS - Caged Combat 5
| 
| align=center| 1
| align=center| 4:53
| 
| 
|-
| Win
| align=center| 7-6 (1)
| Erik Victor
| Submission (Arm-Triangle Choke)
| High Desert Brawl 39 - Superbrawl
| 
| align=center| 1
| align=center| 2:46
| 
| 
|-
| Win
| align=center| 6-6 (1)
| Mike Dolce
| Decision (Split)
| UFO - Rumble at the Races
| 
| align=center| 3
| align=center| 5:00
| 
| 
|-
| Loss
| align=center| 5-6 (1)
| Brandon Melendez
| TKO (Punches)
| Showdown Fights 1 - Burkman vs. Paul
| 
| align=center| 2
| align=center| 3:31
| 
| 
|-
| Win
| align=center| 5-5 (1)
| Jory Erickson
| Decision (Split)
| CS - CageSport 8
| 
| align=center| 3
| align=center| 5:00
| 
| 
|-
| Win
| align=center| 4-5 (1)
| John Heath
| Submission (Guillotine Choke)
| CCCF - Saturday Night Fights
| 
| align=center| 2
| align=center| 2:36
| 
| 
|-
| Loss
| align=center| 3-5 (1)
| Nathan Coy
| TKO (Punches)
| CS - CageSport 6
| 
| align=center| 1
| align=center| 3:39
| 
| 
|-
| Win
| align=center| 3-4 (1)
| Chris Ensley
| Submission (Guillotine Choke)
| DB - Desert Brawl 37
| 
| align=center| 2
| align=center| 2:35
| 
| 
|-
| Loss
| align=center| 2-4 (1)
| Dave Culbertson
| TKO (Doctor Stoppage)
| DB - Desert Brawl 36
| 
| align=center| 2
| align=center| 4:59
| 
| 
|-
| Win
| align=center| 2-3 (1)
| Drew Dimanlig
| Submission (Armbar)
| WEC 22: The Hitmen
| 
| align=center| 1
| align=center| 3:47
| 
| 
|-
| Loss
| align=center| 1-3 (1)
| Chris Lytle
| Submission (Forearm Choke)
| WEC 12 - Halloween Fury 3
| 
| align=center| 1
| align=center| 2:53
| 
| 
|-
| Draw
| align=center| 1-2 (1)
| Dennis Hallman
| Draw
| DB 9 - DesertBrawl 9
| 
| align=center| 3
| align=center| 5:00
| 
| 
|-
| Loss
| align=center| 1-2
| Shonie Carter
| Decision (Unanimous)
| WEC 8 - Halloween Fury 2
| 
| align=center| 3
| align=center| 5:00
| 
| 
|-
| Win
| align=center| 1-1
| Ryan Schultz
| KO (Punches)
| WEC 7: This Time It's Personal
| 
| align=center| 2
| align=center| 1:56
| 
| 
|-
| Loss
| align=center| 0-1
| Ronald Jhun
| TKO (Knees)
| HC 2 - Hawaii Combat 2
| 
| align=center| 2
| align=center| 0:33
| 
|

References

Mixed martial artists from Oregon
Year of birth missing (living people)
Living people
American male mixed martial artists